Twyn Llech, also known as Black Mountain, is a mountain in the Black Mountains. It is the only Marilyn to fall exactly on the Welsh–English border, straddling Brecknockshire (currently administered as part of the unitary authority of Powys) and Herefordshire. Its parent peak, Waun Fach, lies to the west.

Access
The Black Mountain is the highest point on Hatterrall Ridge. Offa's Dyke Path passes along the ridge, more or less from south to north. A steeper path leads to the summit from near the former youth hostel in the Vale of Ewyas to the west. The summit is unmarked and, because of the very shallow gradients along the summit ridge, virtually impossible to determine in situ. Open access to all the moorland here means that deviation from the paths is allowed. The ground is peaty and normally very wet even in good weather, especially on the highest ground.

It is the highest summit in England south of Great Whernside in the Yorkshire Dales, even though higher neighbours are very close by in Wales. However, some mountain lists, such as the Nuttalls, consider the mountain belongs only to Wales, due to the Black Mountains range being principally a Welsh massif.

Geology
The mountain is composed of sandstones and mudstones of the Senni Formation of the Old Red Sandstone which is of Devonian age. The shape of the Vale of Ewyas to the south and west of the Hatterall ridge strongly suggests that it was occupied by a glacier during at least one ice age, though not perhaps during the last ice age. The plateau was probably ice-free.

References 

Marilyns of England
Marilyns of Wales
Hewitts of England
Hewitts of Wales
Hills of Herefordshire
Nuttalls
Mountains and hills of Powys
Black Mountains, Wales
Highest points of English counties